In Babylonian religion, Belit Ilani was a title described as meaning "mistress of the gods" and the name of the "evening star of desire". It has been associated with Ninlil and Astarte and has been found inscribed on portraits of a woman blessing a suckling child with her right hand. Theophilus G. Pinches noted that Belit Ilani or Nnlil had seven different names (such as Nintud, Ninhursag, Ninmah, etc.) for seven different localities in ancient Sumer.

See also
Bel (mythology)

References

Mesopotamian goddesses
Astarte